Cardito is a comune (municipality) in the Metropolitan City of Naples in the Italian region Campania, located about  northeast of Naples.

Cardito borders the following municipalities: Afragola, Caivano, Casoria, Crispano, Frattamaggiore. It was once mainly known for its  strawberry and  asparagus production; now also buffalo mozzarella is produced.

The city was perhaps founded by people from the nearby Atella around 350-300 BC. It is connected by the SS 87 Sannitica national road.

References

Cities and towns in Campania